Llauro is a commune in the Pyrénées-Orientales department in southern France.

Geography 
Llauro is located in the canton of Les Aspres and in the arrondissement of Perpignan.

Population

Sites of interest 
 Saint Martin church

See also
Communes of the Pyrénées-Orientales department

References

Communes of Pyrénées-Orientales